Elaine "Lainey" Lui (born September 26, 1973) is a Canadian television personality and reporter. She pens a website, LaineyGossip, is an anchor on CTV's etalk, and is also a co-host on CTV's daily talk series The Social.

Early life and education
Lui was born and raised in Toronto. Her parents, Judy and Bernard, immigrated to Canada from Hong Kong in 1970. They worked odd jobs, including washing dishes and cleaning hotel rooms. Eventually, her father found stable work as an accountant. When Lui was 6, her parents divorced and her mother returned to Hong Kong. Lui spent many summers in Hong Kong to visit her mother. Her parents reunited when she was 16.

Lui attended middle school and high school at the Toronto French School and graduated from Lawrence Park Collegiate Institute. In 1996, she graduated with a B.A. in French and history from the University of Western Ontario.

Career

After graduating from Western, she worked for Rogers Communications and trained employees to install Internet connections.

Lui worked in not-for-profit fundraising. She had been living in Vancouver and working for the University of British Columbia when she returned to Toronto to care for her mother, who needed a kidney transplant. She then took a job with Covenant House, which offers shelter and services for the homeless. LaineyGossip.com grew out of an email that Lui sent to two friends to keep them up to date on celebrity gossip. The subscriber list quickly grew and she started her blog. She left Covenant House in 2006 to commit herself full-time to her blog.

etalk, CTV's Canadian entertainment newsmagazine, hired Lui in 2006. Since joining etalk, Lui has covered the Oscars, the Super Bowl, the JUNO Awards, Sundance Film Festival, Cannes Film Festival, Toronto International Film Festival (TIFF) and the MuchMusic Video Awards (MMVAs).

The Social premiered on September 2, 2013 with Lui as co-host alongside Melissa Grelo, Cynthia Loyst and Traci Melchor. The show airs daily at 1 p.m. on CTV.

Lui participated in the 2015 edition of Canada Reads, where she advocated for Raziel Reid's novel When Everything Feels Like the Movies.

Hosting the Smut Soiree
Lui hosts the Smut Soiree, an annual event at which she talks about the latest gossip in pop culture and Hollywood. The event was first held in 2005.

Personal life

Lui married Jacek Szenowicz when she was 28 years old. They now reside in Toronto with their dogs Barney and Elvis. Jacek helps to run LaineyGossip.com. Lui has stated that she and her husband do not wish to have children.

Controversy 
In June 2020, comments made by Lui on her website resurfaced, causing scandal, after Lui accused Jessica Mulroney of using her white privilege against lifestyle blogger Sasha Exeter, the niece of Lui's co-star at the time on The Social, Marci Ien. These included comments described as body-shaming, slut-shaming, homophobic, transphobic, racist, sexist, misogynistic and ageist. These comments sparked outrage and were widely discussed on social media. However, unlike Mulroney, Lui faced no disciplinary action and retained all of her jobs. In April 2021, Lui was quoted as saying, "For me, part of restorative justice is making contrition an ongoing process [...] I don’t ever plan to get to a point where I say, ‘I don’t want to talk about this anymore.’ I’ll talk about it as much as anyone wants me to talk about it. I don’t think an apology is a one-and-done thing [...] I’m trying to be much more aware of not benefitting but also taking responsibility — but not being praised for taking responsibility. It’s a very uncomfortable place to be.”

Writing

References

External links
LaineyGossip

1973 births
Living people
Canadian infotainers
Canadian people of Hong Kong descent
Canadian television talk show hosts
Canadian television reporters and correspondents
Writers from Toronto
Writers from Vancouver
University of Western Ontario alumni
Canadian bloggers
21st-century Canadian non-fiction writers
Canadian memoirists
21st-century Canadian women writers
Canadian writers of Asian descent
CTV Television Network people
Canadian women memoirists
Canadian women television journalists
Canadian women bloggers
21st-century memoirists